Potter Puppet Pals is a puppet show web series parodying the Harry Potter novel series by J. K. Rowling, created by Neil Cicierega.

The first two episodes were animated, both released in 2003 on Newgrounds. On September 26, 2006, the series was re-launched on YouTube under Cicierega's page as "Potions Class". Six more episodes were released by Cicierega between 2006 and 2009. Approximately one year after the seventh episode was released, a new video appeared on Neil's channel announcing an exclusive Potter Puppet Pals channel. On the same day, three more videos were released on this page. The Potter Puppet Pals have made appearances at many Harry Potter parties and conventions, such as the Yule Ball and LeakyCon.

Both the original animated episodes, as well as the first seven live-action episodes, have been published to the official Potter Puppet Pals webpage.

Characters

Much of the humor derived from the series originates from Cicierega's unique interpretation of the principal Harry Potter characters. Some characters are given personalities designed to contrast completely with their attitudes in the Harry Potter books. Cicierega's Harry is portrayed as an extremely brash, arrogant, and vain teenager who is "rife with boyish attitude," while Dumbledore is a nudist. Other times, an aspect of the original stories is blown out of proportion for comedic effect, such as Hermione Granger's love of reading and matter-of-fact approach to problems. In the episode Snape's Diary, Hermione remarks, "I know a thing or two about books, and that's a book!" Later in the same episode, she excitedly shouts, "Here's one of the quills I carry with me at all times!"

Throughout the course of the series, multiple characters are seemingly killed off, such as Neville in "Neville's Birthday" and Voldemort in "Harryween", neither have made appearances since.

List of characters

Unseen characters

Episodes

Flash animations

Live-action puppetry

Special episodes

The Mysterious Ticking Noise
"The Mysterious Ticking Noise", released March 23, 2007, was the 22nd most-viewed video on YouTube as of January 1, 2013 with over 137.5 million views. The video was nominated and won in the Comedy category in the 2008 YouTube Awards with 61.6% of the votes in that category.
In the video, Severus Snape hears a strange ticking and, noticing it has a catchy rhythm, begins singing to it, followed by Dumbledore, Ron Weasley, Hermione Granger, and Harry Potter. Towards the end, Ron discovers that the source of the ticking is a pipe bomb that explodes as they celebrate, letting Lord Voldemort sing his name by himself to the tune of "Lollipop". At the New York premiere of Harry Potter and the Deathly Hallows – Part 2, Alan Rickman was interviewed by MTV and quoted as saying “[Potter Puppet Pals] is very beautifully done, that little piece of work. Can you get rich from that? I hope they did." Daniel Radcliffe also mentioned in an interview by MTV that the cast of the Harry Potter film series should do a live action version of "The Mysterious Ticking Noise" for a charity.

On 23 March 2017, a 4K remake of the original video was posted to the Potter Puppet Pals channel to mark the 10th anniversary of the original.

References

External links
 Potter Puppet Pals Website
 Potterpuppetpals YouTube Page
 Neil Cicierega YouTube Page

2003 web series debuts
YouTube original programming
Puppets
Works based on Harry Potter
2000s parody films
Fantasy parodies
Web series featuring puppetry
American parody films
Unofficial adaptations
Films about witchcraft